Romain Ponsart (born 27 April 1992) is a retired French figure skater. He is the 2012 Triglav Trophy bronze medalist and 2015 Toruń Cup champion. He is a six-time French National medalist.

Personal life 
Ponsart was born on 27 April 1992 in Charleville-Mézières, France. He was previously engaged to American figure skater Mariah Bell.

Career 

Ponsart began competing on the ISU Junior Grand Prix series in 2009. In 2011, he was selected to compete at the World Junior Championships and finished 17th.

In the 2011–12 season, Ponsart received his first senior Grand Prix assignment, the 2011 Trophée Éric Bompard, and placed eighth. At the end of the season, he won his first senior international medal, bronze at the 2012 Triglav Trophy. The following season, he struggled with injuries.

In October 2013, Ponsart injured his ankle at the Master's de Patinage, causing him to withdraw from the 2013 Trophée Éric Bompard.

In August 2015, Ponsart relocated to Poitiers to train with new coach Brian Joubert. However, the two had disagreements regarding training and ended the coaching relationship in November of that year.

In 2016, Ponsart began training under his new coach, Rafael Arutyunyan.

Programs

Competitive highlights 
GP: Grand Prix; CS: Challenger Series; JGP: Junior Grand Prix

References

External links 

 

1992 births
French male single skaters
Living people
People from Charleville-Mézières
Sportspeople from Ardennes (department)
Competitors at the 2015 Winter Universiade
Competitors at the 2017 Winter Universiade